Abraham Gracefield Thomas (born 26 July 1950) is a plastic and reconstructive surgeon, specializing in microsurgery, from India.

Career
Dr Abraham Thomas, born in Thamarasserry, Calicut, Kerala, had all his medical education at Christian Medical College Ludhiana. He trained in surgery under Dr Eggleston and plastic surgery under Dr Feierabend and Dr Bindra. He was trained in microvascular surgery by Marko Godina, a famous microsurgeon from Yugoslavia. In 1994 in Christian Medical College Ludhiana, he successfully reattached the avulsed face and scalp of a nine-year-old girl, Sandeep Kaur. This achievement has recently been recognised by American College of Surgeons by incorporating Thomas in their 100 years timeline for achievements in surgery. Thomas attached the arteries, veins and nerves successfully and almost the entire face and scalp survived. The girl had near-complete recovery of the muscles of her face. Sandeep continued her studies after recovery and she is an accomplished registered nurse at the hospital. Thomas is a recipient of the Dr. B. C. Roy Award in Development of Specialities category for the year 2002. He is presently working as vice chairman of Malabar Medical College and Research Center, Calicut.

References

1950 births
Living people
Indian surgeons
Dr. B. C. Roy Award winners
Medical doctors from Kerala
20th-century Indian medical doctors
20th-century surgeons